Marco Camus Muñoz (born 16 November 2001) is a Spanish professional footballer who plays as a right winger for Córdoba CF, on loan from Racing de Santander.

Club career
Born in Santander, Cantabria, Camus was a Racing de Santander youth graduate and signed his first professional contract with the club in July 2019. The following 26 January, he made his senior debut with the reserves, playing the last 30 minutes in a 1–0 Tercera División home win against SD Solares-Medio Cudeyo.

Camus scored his first senior goal on 1 March 2020, netting the opener in a 2–0 away defeat of Vimenor CF. He made his first-team debut on 1 July, coming on as a late substitute for Borja Galán in a 0–1 loss at Extremadura UD in the Segunda División.

On 21 September 2020, Camus was definitely promoted to the main squad, now in the Segunda División B. On 30 January 2023, he joined Córdoba CF on loan until the end of the season.

References

External links

2001 births
Living people
Spanish footballers
Footballers from Santander, Spain
Association football wingers
Segunda División players
Primera Federación players
Segunda División B players
Tercera División players
Rayo Cantabria players
Racing de Santander players
Córdoba CF players